Seizure protein 6 homolog is a protein that in humans is encoded by the SEZ6 gene.

References

Further reading